Arf-GAP with dual PH domain-containing protein 2 is a protein that in humans is encoded by the ADAP2 gene.

References

External links

Further reading